George Michael Fuller (born December 25, 1953, in Los Angeles) is an American theoretical physicist, known for his research on nuclear astrophysics involving weak interactions, neutrino flavor-mixing, and quark matter, as well as the hypothetical nuclear matter.

Education and career
He graduated in physics with a BS in 1976 and a PhD in 1981 from California Institute of Technology (Caltech). His PhD thesis entitled Nuclear weak interaction rates during stellar evolution and collapse was supervised by William A. Fowler. Fuller was from 1985 to 1986 a Research Assistant Professor at the University of Washington's Institute for Nuclear Theory and from 1986 to 1988 a staff member in the Institute of Geophysics and Planetary Physics (IGPP) astrophysics group at Lawrence Livermore National Laboratory. In the department of physics of the University of California, San Diego (UCSD) he was from 1988 to 1992 an Associate Professor and is since 1992 a full Professor. At UCSD he is now a Distinguished Professor of Physics and the Director of the Center for Astrophysics and Space Science (CASS). He was one of six UCSD scientists (including Brian Keating) involved in the early stages of the international collaboration for the POLARBEAR experiment.

He was elected in 1994 a fellow of the American Physical Society. In 2013 he was awarded the Hans A. Bethe Prize with citation:

Selected publications

Articles
  (over 500 citations)
  (over 500 citations)
 
 
 
  (over 750 citations)
 
  (over 600 citations)
 
 
  (over 500 citations)

Books

References

External links
 
 
 
 

1953 births
Living people
20th-century American physicists
21st-century American physicists
American astrophysicists
American nuclear physicists
American cosmologists
Theoretical physicists
California Institute of Technology alumni
University of California, San Diego faculty
Fellows of the American Physical Society